Xylergatoides asper is a species of beetle in the family Cerambycidae, the only species in the genus Xylergatoides.

References

Acanthocinini